Stewart Campbell (born 7 November 1972) is a former Scottish international rugby union player who played for Glasgow Caledonians (now Glasgow Warriors). He played in the Lock position.

Campbell started playing amateur rugby for Strathendrick RFC. Moving through amateur clubs he played for West of Scotland, Dundee HSFP and Melrose RFC.

When professional rugby started in Scotland in 1996, Campbell first played for the Caledonia Reds. On their merger with the Glasgow side he then turned out for Glasgow Caledonians in 1998.

Campbell then played for Treviso in Italy before moving to England to play for the Leicester Tigers and then Yorkshire Carnegie.

Campbell played for Scotland at various age grades, the Club XV side, the 'A' side and the Scottish national team.

External links 
Rugby biography

References 

1972 births
Living people
Rugby union players from Glasgow
Scottish rugby union players
Glasgow Warriors players
Strathendrick RFC players
West of Scotland FC players
Melrose RFC players
Dundee HSFP players
Caledonia Reds players
Leicester Tigers players
Benetton Rugby players
Leeds Tykes players
Scotland international rugby union players
North and Midlands players
Scotland 'A' international rugby union players
Scotland Club XV international rugby union players
Rugby union locks